Pyrops is a genus of planthoppers that occur primarily in southeast Asia, containing about 70 species. They are fairly large insects, with much of the length due to an elongated, upcurving, snout-like projection of the head. The wings are generally brightly patterned in contrasting colors, and they are popular among collectors.

Species

Pyrops aeruginosus (Stål, 1870)
Pyrops agusanensis (Baker, 1925)
Pyrops alboroseus Liang, 1998
Pyrops andamanensis (Distant, 1880)
Pyrops astarte (Distant, 1914)
Pyrops atroalbus (Distant, 1918)
Pyrops auratus Constant, 2021
Pyrops azureus Constant & Mohan, 2017[5]
Pyrops candelaria (Linnaeus, 1758) – type species
Pyrops clavatus (Westwood, 1839)
Pyrops coelestinus (Stål, 1863)
Pyrops connectens (Atkinson, 1885)
Pyrops cultellatus (Walker, 1857)
Pyrops curtiprora (Butler, 1874)
Pyrops cyanirostris (Guerin-Meneville, 1845)
Pyrops delessertii (Guerin-Meneville, 1840)
Pyrops detanii Nagai & Porion, 2004
Pyrops dimotus (Lallemand, 1960)
Pyrops dohrni (Schmidt, 1905)
Pyrops ducalis Stål, 1863
Pyrops effusus (Distant, 1891)
Pyrops esteban Nagai & Porion, 2002
Pyrops erectus (Schmidt, 1905)
Pyrops exsanguis (Gerstaecker, 1895)
Pyrops farinosus Bierman, 1910
Pyrops fumosus (Baker, 1925)
Pyrops gunjii (Satô & Nagai, 1994)
Pyrops guttatus (Walker, 1858)
Pyrops hamdjahi Nagai & Porion, 2002
Pyrops hashimotoi Nagai & Porion, 2002
Pyrops heringi (Schmidt, 1905)
Pyrops hobbyi (Lallemand, 1939)
Pyrops horsfieldii (Westwood, 1839)
Pyrops intricatus (Walker, 1857)
Pyrops ishiharai (Satô & Nagai, 1994)
Pyrops itoi (Satô & Nagai, 1994)
Pyrops jasmini Chew Kea Foo, Porion & Audibert, 2010
Pyrops jefferyi Nagai & Porion, 2002
Pyrops jianfenglingensis Wang, Xu & Qin, 2018
Pyrops karenius (Distant, 1891)
Pyrops kozlovi Porion & Audibert, 2020
Pyrops lathburii (Kirby, 1818)
Pyrops lautus (Stål, 1870)
Pyrops maculatus (Olivier, 1791)
Pyrops maquilinganus (Baker, 1925)
Pyrops nigripennis (Chou & Wang, 1985)
Pyrops nishiguroi Nagai, Porion & Audibert, 2017
Pyrops nishiyamai Nagai & Porion, 2002
Pyrops ochraceus Nagai & Porion, 1996
Pyrops oculatus (Westwood, 1839)
Pyrops peguensis (Schmidt, 1911)
Pyrops philippinus (Stål, 1870)
Pyrops polillensis (Baker, 1925)
Pyrops priscilliae Nagai, Porion & Audibert, 2016
Pyrops pyrorhynchus (Donovan, 1800)
Pyrops pythicus (Distant, 1891)
Pyrops rogersi (Distant, 1906)
Pyrops ruehli Schmidt, 1926
Pyrops samaranus (Baker, 1925)
Pyrops sapphirinus (Schmidt, 1908)
Pyrops sidereus (Distant, 1905)
Pyrops silighinii Porion & Audibert, 2017
Pyrops spinolae (Westwood, 1842)
Pyrops sultana (Adams, 1847)
Pyrops synavei Constant, 2015
Pyrops valerian Nagai & Porion, 2002
Pyrops viridirostris (Westwood, 1848)
Pyrops vitalisius (Distant, 1918)
Pyrops watanabei (Matsumura, 1913)
Pyrops whiteheadii (Distant, 1889)
Pyrops zephyrius (Schmidt, 1907)

Taxonomy
The genus name of Laternaria has been used by some authors, but this name was published in a work that was suppressed in 1955 by an official declaration of the International Code of Zoological Nomenclature (ICZN): Opinion 322. The type species is Pyrops candelaria.

In the genus Pyrops the names of the species follow the rules of the ICZN; that is, since the name of the genus is masculine in gender, the adjectival species epithets in the genus would be given in their masculine form (e.g., ochracea would become ochraceus; candelaria is a noun, however, and does not change to candelarius), though numerous authors have consistently (and incorrectly) treated them as feminine. Under the present rules, generic names ending in -ops must be treated as masculine regardless of the original usage (ICZN Chapter 7, Article 30.1.4.3).

A molecular phylogenetic study suggests that Pyrops is a sister of the genus Saiva and together form tribe Pyropsini.

Ecology
Like many other plant-sap sucking insects, Pyrops species exude honeydew. This honeydew is sometimes gathered by other animals in trophobiotic associations. Pyrops whiteheadi and P. intricatus are known to be attended by Dorylaea sp. cockroaches in Southeast Asia. Pyrops whiteheadi has also been seen tended by a gecko, Gehyra mutilata.

References

External links

 Fulgoromorpha Lists on the Web (FLOW): Pyrops Spinola, 1839 (retrieved 27 June 2018)

 
Fulgorinae
Auchenorrhyncha genera
Taxa named by Maximilian Spinola